Sir James Caleb Anderson, 1st Baronet (21 July 1792 – 4 April 1861), was an inventor.

Biography

James Anderson was the eldest son of John Anderson, the founder of Fermoy, by his second wife, Elizabeth, the only daughter of Mr. James Semple, of Waterford. He was created a baronet on 22 March 1813, of Fermoy in the County of Cork, for the great public services rendered to Ireland by his father. Sir James was a celebrated experimentalist in steam-coaching and took out various patents for his inventions. He lodged specifications in 1831 for "improvements in machinery for propelling vessels on water", in 1837 for "improvements in locomotive engines", and in 1846 for "certain improvements in obtaining motive power, and in applying it to propel carriages and vessels, and to the driving of machinery".

Anderson died in London on 4 April 1861 and was buried on the eastern side of Highgate Cemetery.

Family
By his marriage, in 1815, with Caroline, fourth daughter of Mr. Robert Shaw, of Dublin, he had two sons (both of whom died unmarried) and six daughters. As he left no male issue, the baronetcy became extinct.

Notes

References
 the entry cites:
Patents, 6147, 7407, 11273;
Notes and Queries, 3rd series, vii. 153;
Gent. Mag. ccx. 588.

Irish inventors
1792 births
1861 deaths
Burials at Highgate Cemetery
Baronets in the Baronetage of the United Kingdom
People from Fermoy